Canadian National Railway (CN) Class O-9 steam locomotives were of 0-6-0 wheel arrangement in the Whyte notation, or " C " in UIC classification. These locomotives were built for the Grand Trunk Railway (GT) and Detroit and Toledo Shore Line Railroad (D&TSL) from 1903 through 1913. Many were scrapped during the 1930s although some survived into the 1950s with sequential renumbering into the CN 7200 series in 1952 and 7300 series in 1956. The sole survivor of this class is number 7312, which has been owned by the Strasburg Rail Road in Pennsylvania since 1960.

References 

0-6-0 locomotives
ALCO locomotives
Baldwin locomotives
CLC locomotives
Lima locomotives
MLW locomotives
O-09

Railway locomotives introduced in 1903 
Shunting locomotives